Maria-Eugenia Chivorchian  (born ) is a retired Romanian female volleyball player, who played as a universal.

She was part of the Romania women's national volleyball team at the 2002 FIVB Volleyball Women's World Championship in Germany. On club level she played with Amici Bacau.

Clubs
 Amici Bacau (2002)

References

External links 
 http://www.fivb.org/vis_web/volley/wwch2002/pdf/match018.pdf

1982 births
Living people
Romanian women's volleyball players
Place of birth missing (living people)